Sochaczew County was a county of the Sochaczew Land, Rawa Voivodeship located within the Greater Poland Province of the Crown of the Kingdom of Poland, Polish–Lithuanian Commonwealth. Its capital was Sochaczew.

Notes

References

Counties of Rawa Voivodeship
1793 disestablishments in the Polish–Lithuanian Commonwealth
States and territories disestablished in 1793